The Air Command Commander Elite is an American autogyro that was designed and produced by Air Command International of Caddo Mills, Texas.  When it was available the aircraft was supplied as a kit for amateur construction or as a conversion kit for the earlier Air Command Commander.

As of 2012 the design is no longer advertised for sale by the company.

Design and development
The Commander Elite improves on the original Commander in that it has raised landing gear that positions the engine thrustline vertically at the center of gravity, which eliminates changes in pitch with throttle changes. The gyroplane was designed to comply with the US Experimental - Amateur-built rules. It features a single main rotor, a single-seat open cockpit without a windshield, tricycle landing gear and a twin cylinder, two-stroke, liquid-cooled, dual-ignition  Rotax 582 engine in pusher configuration.

The rudder and tailplane are made from carbon fibre.

Operational history
By December 2012 ten examples had been registered in the United States with the Federal Aviation Administration.

Specifications (Commander Elite)

See also
List of rotorcraft

References

Commander Elite
1990s United States sport aircraft
Homebuilt aircraft
Single-engined pusher autogyros